Thomas Jefferson Medal may refer to several different awards named in honor of Thomas Jefferson:
Thomas Jefferson Medal for Distinguished Achievement in the Arts, Humanities, and Social Sciences, given by the American Philosophical Society
Thomas Jefferson Medal for Outstanding Contributions to Natural Science, given by the Virginia Museum of Natural History Foundation
Thomas Jefferson Star for Foreign Service, an award of the United States Department of State
The University of Virginia and Thomas Jefferson Foundation have jointly granted Jefferson Foundation medals:
Thomas Jefferson Foundation Medal in Architecture, given jointly by the Thomas Jefferson Foundation and the University of Virginia School of Architecture
Thomas Jefferson Foundation Medal in Law, given jointly by the Thomas Jefferson Foundation and the University of Virginia School of Law
Thomas Jefferson Foundation Medal in Citizen Leadership, given jointly by the Thomas Jefferson Foundation and the University of Virginia
Thomas Jefferson Foundation Medal in Global Innovation
 Jefferson Awards for Public Service are given by the American Institute for Public Service